Bensins Island is the only island in South Bentinck Arm, an inlet (fjord) in the Central Coast region of British Columbia, Canada.  It is located across the inlet from Tallheo Hot Springs.  Slightly north of the island on the shore of the inlet was Qnklst, a Nuxalk village.  Qnklst is a Nuxalk name for "island" meaning "stone bottom" or "a bottom of stone".

Name origin
The name is a corruption of "Menzies", in reference to Archibald Menzies, the naturalist of Captain Vancouver's expedition to the Pacific Northwest.

See also
List of islands of British Columbia

References

Islands of British Columbia
Central Coast of British Columbia